The estate of Sivaganga, as per British records also known as Kingdom of the Lesser Marava, was a permanently settled zamindari estate in the Ramnad sub-division of Madura district, Madras Presidency, British India. Along the estate of Ramnad, it formed one of the two zamindari estates of Ramnad subdivision.

The Sivaganga estate was ruled by a branch of the Marava royal family of Ramnad. The kingdom was reduced to a zamindari by the British in 1803. The zamindari was abolished through socialist reform on India's independence.

History 
The Pudukkottai and Sivaganga regions were actually parts of the kingdom of Ramnad when it became independent in the 1680s. In 1725, Ramnad was invaded by the polygar of Nalkottai who captured two-fifths of the kingdom including the territory of Sivaganga. Since then, occasionally, Ramnad was referred to as the kingdom of the Greater Marava and Sivaganga, the kingdom of the Lesser Marava. 

In 1773, the British conquered Sivaganga and killed Muthu Vaduganatha Periyavudaya Thevar, the king of Sivaganga. His widow, queen Velu Nachiyar, fled to Dindigul and lived under the protection of Hyder Ali. During her exile, she formed an armed force and alliance with Hyder Ali. In 1780, she became the first queen in India to fight against the British colonial power. Accompanied by Maruthu brothers she recaptured Sivaganga and made her daughter her heir. According to East India Company documents, the queen died under somewhat suspicious circumstances.

In 1803, the British restored the rightful heir Udayathevan to the throne. The kingdom was subsequently reduced to a zamindari by the permanent settlement of Lord Wellesley. The estate was ruled by the descendants of Udayathevan till India's independence when the zamindari was abolished.

Monarchs 
 Vijaya Raghunatha Sasivarna Periyavudaya Thevar (1730–1750)
 Muthu Vaduganatha Periyavudaya Thevar (1750–1772)
 Velu Nachiyar (1780–1790)
 Vellacci (1790–1793)
 Vangam Periya Udaya Thevar (1793–1801)

References 

 

States and territories established in 1725
States and territories disestablished in 1947
Historical Indian regions
Zamindari estates
Madurai Nayak dynasty
Madras Presidency
Sivaganga district
1947 disestablishments in India
1725 establishments in India